Salar  is a census town in the Bharatpur II CD block in the Kandi subdivision of Murshidabad district in the state of West Bengal, India.

Geography

Location

Area overview
The area shown in the map alongside, covering Berhampore and Kandi subdivisions, is spread across both the natural physiographic regions of the district, Rarh and Bagri. The headquarters of Murshidabad district, Berhampore, is in this area. The entire area is overwhelmingly rural with over 80% of the population living in the rural areas.

Note: The map alongside presents some of the notable locations in the subdivisions. All places marked in the map are linked in the larger full screen map.

Demographics
According to the 2011 Census of India, Salar had a total population of 42,594, of which 22,600 (53%) were males and 19,994 (47%) were females. Population in the age range 0–6 years was 11,095. The total number of literate persons in Salar was 31,499 (79.10% of the population over 6 years). Muslim population is more than Hindu population.

Civic administration

Police station
Salar Police Station has jurisdiction over Bharatpur II CD Block.

Railway station
Salar Railway Station is controlled by Katwa GRP.

CD Block headquarters
The headquarters of Bharatpur II CD block are located near 2 no. Railgate at Salar. Total villages are 51 villages and 7 G.P, Kagram, Salar, Simulia, Tenya–Baidyapur, Malihati, Salu and Talibpur.

Infrastructure
According to the District Census Handbook, Murshidabad,  2011, Salar covered an area of 7.1492 km2. It had 18 km roads with open drains. The protected water-supply involved overhead tank, tap water from untreated source etc. It had 3,200 domestic electric connections, 100 road lighting points. Among the medical facilities it had 1 hospital, 1 family welfare centre, 1 veterinary hospital, 1 charitable hospital/ nursing home, 19 medicine shops. Among the educational facilities, it had 11 primary schools, 4 middle schools, 3 secondary schools, 2 senior secondary schools, 1 general degree college. It had 4 recognised shorthand, typewriting & vocational training institutes, 1 non-formal education centre (Sarva Shiksha Abhiyan). Among the social, recreational & cultural facilities it had 1 cinema theatre, 1 public library. It produced beedi, rice. It had the branch offices of 2 nationalised banks, 1 agricultural credit society, 3 non-agricultural credit societies.

Economy

Banking and financial services
State Bank of India.
Allahabad Bank.
Bank of India. 
Bangiya Gramin Vikash Bank.
Bandhan Bank.
United Bank of India.
Murshidabad District Central Co-operative Bank.
Salar Arohon Financial Pvt.

Transport

Train
Salar railway station is situated on the Howrah-Katwa-Azimganj line. It connects to the major cities like Kolkata, Siliguri, Guwahati, Dibrugarh, Rampurhat, Malda Town, Katihar, Kishanganj, Alipurduar.

Bus

There is a bus terminus named Tridib Chaudhuri Bus Terminus. The Kandi-Katwa Road passes through It has good connection with Baharampore, Katwa, Bolpur, Bardhaman, Asansol.

A NBSTC bus started from Salar to Kolkata. NBSTC bus to Digha and Durgapur stops at Salar.

A private bus service to Siliguri is available from Salar.

Education 
1.Salar Edward Zakariah Higher Secondary School, P.O. Salar, District: Murshidabad, West Bengal, India.
2. Salar K.K. Girls High School P.O. Salar, District: Murshidabad, West Bengal, India.³ salar Saleh memorial high school, post salar,district murshidabad

Colleges/ other institutions
Muzaffar Ahmed Mahavidyalaya was established in 1986 at Salar. Affiliated with the University of Kalyani it offers courses in Bengali, English, Sanskrit, Arabic, history, geography, political science, sociology and education.
Shyamangini Kundu College of Education.
Dali kundu Primary Teachers Training Institute.

High schools
Salar E Z Higher Secondary School
Salar KK Girls High School
Salar saleh Memorial high school
Govt.Model School, Bharatpur-II Block
Senior Rose Mary School
St. Stephens High School
Al Hilal Mission
Al Ameen Mission
Peace Islamic Academy( A.H. Academy)
Salar Mallickpara Girls Jr.High School

Primary schools
Swarasati Debi public school Salar
Shemrock Primary Salar
Salar Kazipara Pry. School
Salar Adarsha Primary School
Rose Mary Nursery School
Salar Mallick Para S. M. Jr. Basic School
Saraswati public school
Little Angel Public School
Salar Gurukul nursery school
Radix Mission
Salar K.K Girls Primary School

Culture
The main festivals of Salar are:
Eid
Muharram
Jagadhatri Puja
Durga Puja

Besides, there are three fair celebrations organized every year.  The biggest fair is the Pilkhundi Fair. The other two are Muharram Fair and Mallickpara Fair.

Foods

Salar is famous in Murshidabad for delicious Muslim dishes like 
Seekh Kebab, Tanduri Roti, Halwa, Nalli Nihari, Liver, Brain Fry, Kofta, Tikkia, Mangso Kosha etc.

Healthcare
Salar Rural Hospital functions with 30 beds. Beside it, nearby hospital is Katwa sub-divisional Hospital and Kandi sub-divisional Hospital.

Notable people

Khondkar Fazli Rubbee (The Dewan of Murshidabad Estate).
A K M Zakaria (Ex-mayor of Kolkata Corporation)
Abul Barkat (Language rights activist and Martyr of 21 February Bangali Language Movement)

References

Villages in Murshidabad district